Citizen of Westminster is an early example of Australian television drama which aired on ABC. A one-off play set in England, it aired live on 8 October 1958 in Sydney, and kinescoped for showing in Melbourne on 30 November 1958. Australian TV drama was relatively rare at the time.

It is not known if a copy still exists of the presentation, given the wiping of the era.

Plot
A British M.P. is in love with a married woman.

Cast
Bruce Beeby
Madi Heed
Ric Hutton
Geoffrey King
Frank Taylor
Robin Blyth

Production
The show starred real-life husband and wife Bruce Beeby and Madi Hedd. The two had just returned to Australia in 1957 after six years of working in British theatre, films and TV. They had previously appeared together for the ABC in Ending It.

The show was filmed at the ABC Studios in Gore Hill, Sydney.

It was broadcast in a series of "live" dramas, shown every fortnight on Sunday night on ABV-2 Melbourne (some broadcast live from Melbourne, others taped from a live Sydney production). In order, they were The Governess, The Last Call, The Rose without a Thorn, The Lark, Citizen of Westminster, and Enemy of the People (the last of "the season").

See also
List of live television plays broadcast on Australian Broadcasting Corporation (1950s)

References

External links
Citizen of Westminster on IMDb

1958 television plays
1950s Australian television plays
Australian Broadcasting Corporation original programming
English-language television shows
Black-and-white Australian television shows
Australian live television shows